Dollard was a federal electoral district in Quebec, Canada, that was represented in the House of Commons of Canada from 1953 to 1988.

History

This riding was created in 1952 from parts of Laval and Mount Royal.

In 1966, it was defined to consist of:
 the City of Saint-Laurent;
 the Towns of Dollard-des-Ormeaux and Roxboro;
 two parts of the City of Pierrefonds, one situated northeast of the Town of Roxboro, and the other bounded on one side by Des Prairies River and on the three other sides by the Town of Roxboro;
 the part of the City of Montreal bounded by a line commencing at the intersection of the Montreal-Laurentians Autoroute and Des Prairies River; east following the Autoroute to the northwestern limit of the City of Saint-Laurent; along the limit with the City of Montreal to the northeastern limit of the City of Pierrefonds; northwest along that limit to Des Prairies River; and back to the Autoroute.

In 1976, it was redefined to consist of:
 the Towns of Dollard-des-Ormeaux and Roxboro;
 those two parts of the City of Pierrefonds, one part lying northeast of the Towns of Dollard-des-Ormeaux and Roxboro, and the other part bounded on one side by des Prairies River and on the other three sides by the Town of Roxboro;
 the part of the City of Saint-Laurent bounded by a line commencing at the intersection of the northwestern limit of the Town of Mount Royal and the track of the Canadian National Railways Company; northwest along the track and the border between the City of Saint-Laurent and the City of Montreal to the northeastern limit of the City of Pierrefonds; along the limit separating the City of Saint-Laurent from the City of Pierrefonds, the Town of Dollard-des-Ormeaux, the City of Dorval, the City of Lachine, the City of Côte-Saint-Luc, the City of Montreal and the Town of Mount Royal to the point of commencement.

It was abolished in 1987 when it was redistributed into Pierrefonds—Dollard and Saint-Laurent—Cartierville ridings.

Members of Parliament

This riding elected the following Members of Parliament:

Election results

See also 

 List of Canadian federal electoral districts
 Past Canadian electoral districts

External links
Riding history from the Library of Parliament

Former federal electoral districts of Quebec